John Urry may refer to:

 John Urry (soldier) (also Hurry) (died 1650), Scottish officer who fought on both sides in the War of the Three Kingdoms
 John Urry (literary editor) (1666–1715), literary editor, nephew of the above
 John Urry (sociologist) (1946–2016), British sociologist

See also
 John Ury (died 1741), Non-juring Anglican priest